Freixo de Espada à Cinta, sometimes erroneously called Freixo de Espada Cinta (an archaism), is a municipality in the northeastern region of Portugal, near the border with Spain, along the Douro River Valley. The population in 2011 was 3,780, in an area of 244.14 km2.

History
There have been historians that affirm that the Narbasi, a proto-Roman Iberian clan mentioned by Ptolemy, first gathered in this region.

Medieval
There are various versions and legends associated with the municipality's toponymy. Of all the examples, there are common deductions: a Espada na Cinta de um Freixo (which literally means sword on the belt of an ash). There is no doubt that freixo in this context refers to the ash tree, a Portuguese derivative of the Latin fraxinus, although the rest of the toponymic name is still confounded in legend. One legend recalls that the settlement of Freixo was established by a nobleman named Feijão, who died in 977, cousin of Saint Rudesind, whose heraldry included both an ash tree and belted-sword, to which the community received its name. Another legend suggests that the name was derived from a nobleman named Espadacinta; after a battle with Arabs along the margins of the Douro River, he arrived in this territory, and tired, he rested in the shadow of a large ash tree, where he hung his sword. This perpetuated the name for the settlement, which soon became known as Freixo de Espadacinta. A similar story recounts that it was King Denis who, fatigued from his battles with his illegitimate son (Afonso Sanches), and travelling through the wilderness of Freixo, he rested under the shadow of the ash tree, where he impaled his broadsword. The King fell asleep, and after a dream, declared that the village would be known as Freixo de Espada à Cinta. Today, near the Matriz Church, which once pertained to the medieval castle, exists an old ash tree, which is accepted by the local residents as the fabled tree impaled by the King.

It was in this region that Afonso II sustained attacks by Alfonso IX of León who protected his sisters. The land was taken and sacked in 1211 by Leonese forces. Much later, in 1236, during the reign of Sancho II Freixe was encircled by the Castilian Infante Afonso, the son of Ferdinand, but the citizens were able to defend the Castilian embargo and drive their forces into retreat. In recompense, the Portuguese monarch conceded the category of vila (town) in 1240.

Shortly after, on 27 March 1248, King Afonso conferred a foral (charter) on this region, and renewing the diploma on 20 January 1273. The medieval privileges of the foral also permitted the town to be represented in the Cortes.

The municipality of Freixo, hoping that a medieval fair could help the merchant community and increase the number of local residents (to defend the territory), made a petition to King Denis in 3017, which the monarch conferred on the city on 9 March 1307 (to be held monthly for a day).

Continuing their rise, the burgh petitioned King Afonso IV to conclude the walling of the town, which also allowed the construction of the Matriz Church completed during the regin of King John IV.

Afonso V maintained many of the infrastructures within the village of Freixo de Espada à Cinta, but donated all the other royal rights to Vasco Fernandes Sampaio, the regions first donatorio, which remained within the hereditary titles of the family for the many centuries (until 19 July 1790 law that abolished the donatorio system).

King Manuel authorized a new foral for Freixo on 1 October 1512.

The village would continue to suffer for many years during the Frontier Wars, namely between 1580 and 1640, as pillaging and destruction of settlements along the border continued between Castile and Portugal. The sacking of Lagoaça and Fornos in 1644 were examples of these events.

On 10 September 1673, brothers of the Order of the Oratory arrived in Freixo, and began to build the Convent of São Filipe Nery, which was the second to be built in Portugal to the invocation of Saint Philip Neri.

Monarchy
Owing to a decline in local agriculture the Juíz de Fora instituted awards to motive the local economy (1786), promoting the three pillars of the economy: olive and cherry orchards and silk production. This would become important as, by 1792, the Douro becomes a navigable waterway, and products could be easily transported by the waterway.

During the Liberal turmoils of the 19th century, the settlements in Lagoaça, Fornos and Mazouco are visited daily by rebel forces that escaped into Spain, during the latter-part of King John IV reign. But by 1832, Freixo was squarely on the side of Miguelist forces, who supported Miguel.

Between 1854 and 1855, the region is infected by a cholera outbreak that especially affected the ecclesiastical parish of Lagoaça. Lagoaça would become a civil parish in 1867, that included the religious parishes of Fornos, Carviçais, Estevais (de Mogadouro), Castelo Branco, Vilarinho dos Galegos and Bruçó.

In the same year, the District Junta Geral of Bragança established a contract with local farmer Manuel Guerra Tenreiro to provide 180,000 feet of mulberry trees to be distributed to many of the municipalities of the District.

During the Janeirinha (1868) the municipal council hall, which then dated back to the medieval epoch was assaulted and burned down.

In 1896 the municipality of Freixo de Espada à Cinta is abolished and its lands appended to the municipality of Torre de Moncorvo. It residents persisted and were able to reposition the region in order to re-establish the municipality on 13 January 1898 (issuance of a municipal foral).

Republic
A local syndicate was established in 1902 (lasting until 1905) to support local agriculture.

On 17 September 1911 the first raillink is inaugurated between Pocinho and Carviçais, but it would be more than 16 years before the communities of Carviçais and Lagoaça would be connected.

The Bishop of Bragança prohibited the typical loas to Santo António which were a mix of oratory and religious satire.

Geography

Physical geography
Freixo de Espada à Cinta is part of the Trás-os-Montes e Alto Douro in the district of Bragança, located 180 kilometres northeast of the city of Porto, 400 kilometres northeast of Lisbon and 100 kilometres south of the district seat. It is bordered on the north by the municipality of Mogadouro, to the west by Torre de Moncorvo, east by the province of Salamanca in Spain, and south by the municipality of Figueira de Castelo Rodrigo.

Ecoregions/Protected area
Located a few minutes from the urban centre, the Praia Fluvial de Congida is a recreational space, with re-qualified leisure spaces, including bar, suspended esplanade, pool and playground. The tourist complex is also the centre for annual trips along the Douro River, organized by the Sociedade Transfronteiriça Congida-La Barca and supported by the municipal council of Freixo de Espada à Cinta and Ayuntamento de Vilvestre. Within this landscape are several houses, which are part of the Douro International, which includes ten rustic one-room bungalows, with pool.

Sport fishing is also popular in this area, which is encountered in the shadow of the Saucelle Dam/Reservoir, and is stocked with minnows, barbel, barb and carp.

Human geography
Administratively, the municipality is divided into 4 civil parishes (freguesias):
 Freixo de Espada à Cinta e Mazouco
 Lagoaça e Fornos 
 Ligares
 Poiares

Economy

Transport
Freixo is crossed by the national E.N.221 (Guarda-Pinhel-Figueira de Castelo Rodrigo-Freixo de Espada à Cinta-Miranda do Douro) accessway, which is five kilometres from Saucelle, an important link to the province of Salamanca in Spain. Departing in the morning and ending their circuit at the end of the day (night), the municipality of Freixo has inter-community bus connections to many of the major cities in the region, including Porto, Lisbon, Bragança, Vila Real and Coimbra.

The nearest railway station is now at Pocinho, the terminus of the railway to Oporto via the Douro Valley. The community was formerly served by the Sabor line, a narrow gauge railway which closed in 1988.

Notable citizens

 Jorge Álvares (before 1500 – 1521), captain under Afonso de Albuquerque, first Portuguese navigator to participate in an expedition from Malacca to Canton, where he ported in Tamau, a neighbouring island of Sanchoão (1514), where he raised a marker to establish Portuguese possession of the territory; he was also known for providing the oldest information to the Portuguese Cortes about Japan, which he entrusted to his friend Francis Xavier (1547) on his return to Europe.
 António José Antunes Navarro, 1st Count of Lagoaça (1803–1867) a Portuguese nobleman and politician.
 Abilio Manuel Guerra Junqueiro (1850 – 1923), poet, writer, politician, antiquarian, collector and Ministerial Attaché to the Portuguese government in Switzerland, more recognized for his published works that were translated into Spanish, English, French and Italian. His state funeral was followed by his interment in the National Pantheon.
 Manuel Quintão Meireles (1880 – 1962), admiral during the southern Angolan campaigns of the Colonial War, he was Minister of Foreign Relations and presidential candidate during the 1951 national elections in opposition to Craveiro Lopes.
 Manuel Maria Sarmento Rodrigues (c.1899 – c.1979), admiral; captain of the torpedo boat NRP Liz; of the gunboats NRP Faro and NRP Tete; of destroyer NRP Lima; commanding officer of the Naval Air Forces; captain of the aviso NRP Bartolomeu Dias; Commandant of the Naval School; Commander of Naval Forces in Mozambique; President of the Marine Academy; Governor of Portuguese Guinea and of Mozambique; and Minister of the Overseas;

Others (without EN Wikilinks)

 Desidério Augusto Ferro de Beça (c.1866 – c.1920), an infantry major, was the chief of the 3rd Platoon of the military's 1st General Division, Senator for Vila Real, as well as Civil Governor of Bragança;
 José Faria Casado (c.1699 – c.1754), doctor of law from the University of Coimbra, presbyter, and grammar lecturer, he was the head of the Collegiate Prory of São Mamede de Mogadouro, leaving behind many juridical decisions and manuscripts canonical law;
 Leocádia da Conceição (c.1596 – c. 1686), nun responsible for publishing  (Life, Miracles, Prophecies and Visions of Mother Leocadia da Conceição for an acolyte of the same convent), died in the Franciscan Convent of Monchique;
 José Alves Feijó (c.1816 – c.1874), bachelors in law, notable advocate and orator, Bishop of Macau, Cape Verde and Bragança, in addition to Deputy and Commander in the Military Order of Christ;
 Augusto Sebastião Guerra, medic and surgeon for the city of Porto, where he operated a clinic and founded the Casa de Saúde healthcare centre;
 Gomes Lages, director-general of the Fazenda Pública of Lisbon, and an intimate of João Carlos Saldanha de Oliveira Daun, 1st Duke of Saldanha, who transitioned the functionary into the Cortes;
 João Taborda de Magalhães, regional prosecutor in Porto and judge in various comarcas, who was known for his austerity and loyalty to the Royal family
 Francisco Manuel Massano (c.1915 – c.1944), priest and missionary, was captured by the Japanese on 21 October 1942, and interned in the Pearls Hill Prison in Singapore where he succumbed to starvation and torture.
 Gonçalo de Medeiros (before 1500 – ca.1552), first Portuguese Jesuit priest, was the confessor of King John III of Portugal and Queen Catherine.
 Diogo da Piedade (before 1600 – c.1635), a Franciscan friar, who worked in the province of Santa Maria da Arrábida, as custodian, guardian and defender of the faith; after his election as provincial authority, he was responsible for the completion of the Convents of Salvaterra and Vale de Figueira.
 Artur Basilio de Sá (c.1912 – c.1964), director of the School of Arts and Offices in Dili, researcher and teacher in the Colonial School, and representative on the board of the Centro de Estudos Históricos Ultramarinos (Overseas Centre for Historical Studies), he was the first biographer of Jorge Álvares
 Francisco Diogo de Sá, commander during the Portuguese Colonial Wars, and appointment of President António Enes, who would later die in Macau after a minor career as Governor of that colony;
 Morais Sarmento, priest, missionary and founder of the Historical Archive of Macau
 Abilio de Lobão Soeiro (c.1860 – c.1924), politician (1906), Civil Governor of Évora (1910), secretary-general of Nyassa (1911), Governor of Cabo Delgado and Niassa, and Senator for the District of Bragança (1919, 1921 and 1922), he was honoured with the Grande Order of Christ (1919), made Knight Commander in the Order of Saint Michael and Saint George by the British King (1924), and Commander in the Order of the Crown of Italy;
 Virgilio Taborda, geographer and professor at the University of Coimbra, considered the youngest lecturer of his generation
 António Maria Teixeira (c.1875 – c.1933), was the Vicar-General and 18th Bishop of the Dioceses of Saint Thomas of Mylapore, awarded by the Marian Congress of Mothers Superiors with the title of Prelado Doméstico de S. Santidade;
 Manuel Teixeira  (c.1912 – c.2001), monsignor; Oriental historian; publisher of various works in the Obsservatore Romano, Archivo Ibero-Americano, Asian Studies, collaborator on the Enciclopédia Verbo, Dicionário da História, A Igreja em Portugal and Enciclopédia Católica Japonesa; he was also a member of the Associação Internacional dos Historiadores da Ásia, the Academia Portuguesa de História and the Academia Portuguesa da Marinha, representing Portugal and Macau in various Congresses, to which the Portuguese government bestowed the Ordem do Império Colonial (1952) and commander in the Ordem do Infante D. Henrique (1979). In 1982 he was proclaimed Man of the Year in Macau, in 1983 he produced the American documentary Os nove velhos mais activos do Mundo, and narrated twelve historical films for television in Macau, in addition to a program for Korean television. In 1985, President Ramalho Eanes conferred on Manoel Rodrigues the Medalha de Valor de Macau for his contributions to the territory;
 Manuel Guerra Tenreiro (c.1826 – c.1881), doctor of law from the University of Coimbra, as well as politician in the Liberal Cortes, was responsible for perpetuating the silk industry in the municipality of Freixo;
 António Varejão (before 1550 – c. 1597), martyred priest for the Missionário do Oriente, killed in Salsete (Philippines); a painting of the priest hangs in the Hall of Sessions, in the Misericórdia in Freixo;

References

External links

Photos from Freixo de Espada à Cinta

Municipalities of Bragança District